Julio Cesar Serrano (born 1 March 1981)  is an Argentine football midfielder who last played  for Club Atlético General Lamadrid in Argentine. He was traded to Slovan Bratislava from the Argentine club Nueva Chicago in January 2008.

External links
 Julio Cesar Serrano at BDFA 
 

1981 births
Living people
People from La Matanza Partido
Argentine footballers
Argentine expatriate footballers
Slovak Super Liga players
Primera Nacional players
Primera B Metropolitana players
ŠK Slovan Bratislava players
Club Almagro players
Instituto footballers
Sacachispas Fútbol Club players
Nueva Chicago footballers
Estudiantes de Buenos Aires footballers
Club Atlético Atlanta footballers
UAI Urquiza players
General Lamadrid footballers
Expatriate footballers in Slovakia
Argentine expatriate sportspeople in Slovakia
Association football midfielders
Sportspeople from Buenos Aires Province